The sixth competition weekend of the 2012–13 ISU Speed Skating World Cup was held in the Olympic Oval in Calgary, Alberta, Canada, from Saturday, 19 January, until Sunday, 20 January 2013.

On the second day of the competition, South Korean Lee Sang-hwa set a new world record of 36.80 seconds in the women's 500 metres.

Schedule of events
Schedule of the event:

Medal summary

Men's events

Women's events

References

6
Isu World Cup, 2012-13, 6
Sport in Calgary
2013 in Alberta